The Assam State Electricity Board (ASEB) is a State Statutory Body of the state of Assam in India. It is under the ownership of Department of Power, Government of Assam. It manages the generation, transmission and distribution of electricity in the state of Assam with its divisions Assam Power Generation Corporation Limited, Assam Electricity Grid Corporation Limited and Assam Power Distribution Company Limited.

Assam State Electricity Board was established in 1958 in the composite state of Assam under the Electricity Act 1948. The existing Board was reconstituted in 1975 after the state was trifurcated into Assam, Meghalaya and Mizoram in 1972. Two central government entities, North Eastern Electric Power Corporation (NEEPCO) and the Power Grid Corporation of India Ltd (PGCIL) supplement the efforts of the state in power development in generation and transmission respectively.

References 

 Power Department, Government of Assam - https://web.archive.org/web/20140227114901/http://assamgovt.nic.in/departments/electricity_dept.asp
 http://www.emt-india.net

State agencies of Assam
Companies based in Assam
State electricity agencies of India
Energy in Assam
1958 establishments in Assam
Government agencies established in 1958